Vernonia amygdalina, a member of the daisy family, is a small shrub that grows in tropical Africa. Its bark is rough. 

V. amygdalina is commonly called  bitter leaf in English because of its bitter taste.  Other African common names include Congo Bololo (D. R. Congo), grawa (Amharic), ewuro (Yoruba), etidot (Efik), onugbu (Igbo), ityuna (Tiv), oriwo (Edo), Awɔnwono (Akan), chusar-doki or shuwaka (Hausa), mululuza (Luganda), labwori (Acholi), olusia (Luo), ndoleh (Cameroon) and olubirizi (Lusoga).

Uses

Food
The leaves are a staple vegetable in soups and stews of various cultures throughout equatorial Africa. They are washed to reduce their bitterness, after which they are dried and used to prepare meat dishes. In Nigeria, leaves are also used in place of hops to brew beer.

Other
In Nigeria, twigs and sticks from this plant are used as a chewing stick for dental hygiene and the stems are used for soap in Uganda. In Ghana, the young leaves rather than the old, has gained credence for its potent anti-diabetic and anti-inflammatory activity; and have been proven using animal models.

Zoopharmacognosy

In the wild, chimpanzees have been observed to ingest the leaves when suffering from parasitic infections.

References

External links

amygdalina
Leaf vegetables
Plants used in traditional African medicine
Flora of West Tropical Africa